Güinía de Miranda, sometimes shortened as Güinía, is a Cuban village and consejo popular ("people's council", i.e. hamlet) of the municipality of Manicaragua, in Villa Clara Province. It has a population of circa 3,000 and the council's administrative territory covers an area of 114.2 km².

History
Founded in 1536, at the end of the 16th century it was an estate depending from Sancti Spíritus. In 1862 Güinía was made up of 50 buildings and had a population of 300. Until 1976, it was part of the municipality of Fomento.

Geography
Güinía de Miranda is a hilltown surrounded by the Escambray Mountains, crossed by the provincial highway linking Manicaragua (18 km west) to Fomento (17 km east) and Cabaiguán (46 km east), both in the bordering Sancti Spíritus Province. It is the northern end of a road to Valle de los Ingenios (41 km south), a tourist site near the city of Trinidad (43 km). A secondary mountain road, 10 km long, links it to Jibacoa, a village close to the Hanabanilla Lake.

The village is 28 km far from Mataguá, 39 from the tourist resort of El Salto del Hanabanilla, 52 from Santa Clara, 65 from Sancti Spíritus, and 74 from Cienfuegos.

See also
Topes de Collantes
Municipalities of Cuba
List of cities in Cuba

References

External links

Populated places in Villa Clara Province
Populated places established in 1536
1536 establishments in the Spanish Empire
1536 establishments in North America